The 2007 Lehigh Mountain Hawks football team was an American football team that represented Lehigh University during the 2007 NCAA Division I FCS football season. Lehigh finished fifth in the Patriot League.

In their second year under head coach Andy Coen, the Mountain Hawks compiled a 5–6 record. Ernest Moore, John Reese, Sedale Threatt and Brannan Thomas were the team captains.

The Mountain Hawks outscored opponents 251 to 232. Their 2–4 conference record placed fifth out of seven in the Patriot League. 

Lehigh played its home games at Goodman Stadium on the university's Goodman Campus in Bethlehem, Pennsylvania.

Schedule

References

Lehigh
Lehigh Mountain Hawks football seasons
Lehigh Mountain Hawks football